The 2015 Russian Cup Final decided the winner of the 2014–15 Russian Cup, the 23rd season of Russia's main football cup. It was played on 21 May 2015 at the Central Stadium in Astrakhan, between Lokomotiv Moscow and Kuban Krasnodar. Lokomotiv came back from behind and emerged victorious with a 3-1 win in extra time.

The winner qualified for the group stage of the UEFA Europa League and also faced the champions of the 2014–15 Russian Premier League, Zenit Saint Petersburg in the Russian Super Cup on 12 July 2015.

Venue

The Russian Cup final was held for the first time ever at Central Stadium in Astrakhan. Kuban Stadium in Krasnodar and Otkrytie Arena in Moscow were touted to be other potential alternatives but ultimately the stadium was announced by the Russian Football Union as the venue of the final through an official statement on Twitter on 30 March 2015.

Central Stadium is the home stadium of Volgar Astrakhan and it holds 17,500 people, all seated. The stadium was originally built in 1955 but it underwent a total reconstruction in the summer of 2013. The stadium has been earmarked as a training facility for the 2018 FIFA World Cup.

Background
Lokomotiv played their 7th Russian Cup final, second only to CSKA's 10. Prior to the 2015 final, they have won five, against the seven won by their cross town rivals. Their most recent appearance at the final was in 2007. Indeed, they faced the now-defunct FC Moscow and won the contest courtesy of a goal from Garry O'Connor in extra-time.

As for Kuban, it was their first ever appearance at the Russian Cup final. Indeed, their best performance ever in the Russian Cup came in 2012–13 Russian Cup, when they were eliminated by Zenit on penalties in the quarter-finals. As a side note, Leonid Kuchuk, the current manager of Kuban, faced Lokomotiv in the final after he was sacked from the same position earlier this season following a disappointing start at the helm of the Muscovite club.

It was also the first time that the two clubs met in the Russian Cup final.

Road to the final

Match

Details

References

External links
  Russian Cup on the website of the Russian Football Union
  Department of professional football of the Russian Football Union
  Russian Cup at the RFPL website
  Russia - Cup Finals, RSSSF.com

2015 Russian Cup Final
Cup
Russian Cup
Sport in Astrakhan
FC Lokomotiv Moscow matches
FC Kuban Krasnodar